Stefanie Thalman known as Stefi Talman (born January 3, 1958 in Zurich) is a Swiss-born shoe designer of Eurasian descent.

Life and background
Stefi Talman was born 1958 in Zurich, Switzerland, where she also spent her childhood. Her mother, Regula Nydegger is a rhythmic teacher from Switzerland. Her father Leung Kam Tim is a mathematician from Hong Kong, who is now living in France. When Talman was about four years old, her mother married Swiss painter Roland Thalmann, from whom she received her last name.

In 1975 Talman studied for a year at the  Zurich University of the Arts (HGKZ). Afterwards she started a three-year apprenticeship as a shoemaker and finished her education with a further training for cut-technique at the Ars Sutoria institute for shoe design in Milan.

Label
In 1979 Talman opened her first atelier in Zürich, where she produced a small range of handmade shoes. The pieces, striking for their lightness and unusual colouring, were considered innovative at the time and led to a collaboration with a bigger distributor.  In 1980 she showed her first collection under the label of Stefi Talman. Among the only four creations, which were available in a wide range of colours, was a shoe called ZIP. A half-boot, with a zipper crossing the instep at an angle. This creation, which quickly became a fashion sensation and has been frequently imitated, awoke the global fashion industry’s interest and introduced the Stefi Talman label to an international clientele. The label ceased production in 1986 after seven collections and several changes of producers and manufacturers.

Talman started to work as a freelancer for different European and Asian shoe companies, such as Charles Jourdan, Free Lance, Fiorucci and the Central Group in  Bangkok.

1994 saw the designer re-launch her label Stefi Talman in Zürich. Since  then Talman has worked closely with a shoe manufacturer located near Venice,
Italy. In 1999 she expanded the label with a new range of wallets, bags and accessories.  In 2001 Stefi Talman opened her own boutique in Zürich, Switzerland.

Style
Talman still produces the main part of her lasts herself. Her distinctive style shows through functional design features, clear lines, colorful accentuation and contrasts.  Talman uses high quality materials, such as calf-fur and goat- and calfskin, with a preference for unusual prints and surfaces.

Other activities and exhibitions
1992 curatorship with Caro Niederer for the exhibition “Oriental Spirit in contemporary Zürich Flats“

1995 mentor of the degree program “Jewelry And Gadgetry” at the Zurich University of the Arts.

1997 Creatures Comfort, exhibition of fashion design and art, Zurich

1997–1998 teaching assignment at the School of Design of Pforzheim University in Germany

1998 Stefi Talman shoes were shown at the exhibition “Objet Du Désir” at the Zurich museum Bellerive 

2002 Acquisition by the Bundesamt für Kultur of 16 Stefi Talman designs as a loan for the design collection of the Museum of Design Zurich

2007 Stefi Talman joins the executive committee of the Netzdk, the alumni organisation of the Zurich University of the arts

Mentioned in the following publications
„1977“ by Pietro Mattioli, Edition Patirck Frey

„HOT LOVE - Swiss Punk and Wave“ by Lurker Grand, Edition Patrick Frey

„Swissness, 43 Helvetische Errungenschaften“ by Klaus Leuschel, Niggli Verlag

External links
 official Stefi Talman website

Notes

Shoe designers
Swiss fashion designers
Swiss women fashion designers
Living people
Zurich University of the Arts alumni
1958 births